Nguyễn Đình Tấn (Kiến An, Hải Phòng, 1930 - 28 January 2002) was a Vietnamese classical composer. He studied at the Tchaikovsky Conservatory. As an army officer in the cultural section he was entrusted with collection of folk songs such as Quan họ songs.

Works
Songs
 "Lời thề sắt son", (Iron oath)
 "Tôi lắng nghe sông Đà gọi Thác Bà" (I listen to the Black River call Thác Bà falls)
 opera - Tình yêu của em ('My Love')
 symphonic poem - Emily, con! (Emily my child) to the poem of Tố Hữu
 cantata - Thế hệ Hồ Chí Minh, thế hệ anh hùng (Generation of Ho Chi Minh, generation of heroes)
 symphony - Cây đuốc sống - A Living Torch

References

1930 births
2002 deaths
Vietnamese composers